Petro Chemical Complex INA is a town and an industrial notified area in Vadodara district in the Indian state of Gujarat.

Demographics
 India census, Petro Chemical Complex INA had a population of 7336. Males constitute 53% of the population and females 47%. Petro Chemical Complex INA has an average literacy rate of 80%, higher than the national average of 59.5%: male literacy is 83%, and female literacy is 76%. In Petro Chemical Complex INA, 14% of the population is under 6 years of age.

References

Cities and towns in Vadodara district